The 1935 season was the 34th season of competitive football (soccer) in Brazil.

Campeonato Paulista

In 1935 there were two different editions of the Campeonato Paulista. One was organized by the Associação Paulista de Esportes Atléticos (APEA) while the other one was organized by the Liga Paulista de Foot-Ball (LPF).

APEA's Campeonato Paulista

Final Standings

Championship Playoff

In the first match, Ypiranga-SP, as a protest against the referee, abandoned the match and the points were awarded to Portuguesa.

Portuguesa declared as the APEA's Campeonato Paulista champions by aggregate score of 7-4.

LPF's Campeonato Paulista

Final Standings

Santos declared as the LPF's Campeonato Paulista champions.

Campeonato Carioca

In 1935, there were two different editions of the Campeonato Carioca. One was organized by the Federação Metropolitana de Desportos (FMD) while the other one was organized by the Liga Carioca de Foot-Ball (LCF).

FMD's Campeonato Carioca

Botafogo declared as the FMD's Campeonato Carioca champions.

LCF's Campeonato Carioca

America-RJ declared as the LCF's Campeonato Carioca champions.

State championship champions

Other competition champions

(1)Two different Campeonato Brasileiro de Seleções Estaduais editions were contested in 1935. The professional competition was organized by the FBF (Federação Brasileira de Futebol) while the amateur competition was organized by the CBD (Confederação Brasileira de Desportos). Rio de Janeiro (Distrito Federal) won both competitions.

Brazil national team
The Brazil national football team did not play any matches in 1935.

References

 Brazilian competitions at RSSSF
 1934-1938 Brazil national team matches at RSSSF

 
Seasons in Brazilian football
Brazil